Binary may refer to:

Science and technology

Mathematics 
 Binary number, a representation of numbers using only two digits (0 and 1)
 Binary function, a function that takes two arguments
 Binary operation, a mathematical operation that takes two arguments
 Binary relation, a relation involving two elements
 Binary-coded decimal, a method for encoding for decimal digits in binary sequences
 Finger binary, a system for counting in binary numbers on the fingers of human hands

Computing 
 Binary code, the digital representation of text and data
 Bit, or binary digit, the basic unit of information in computers
 Binary file, composed of something other than human-readable text
 Executable, a type of binary file that contains machine code for the computer to execute
 Binary tree, a computer tree data structure in which each node has at most two children

Astronomy 
 Binary star, a star system with two stars in it
 Binary planet, two planetary bodies of comparable mass orbiting each other
 Binary asteroid, two asteroids orbiting each other

Biology 
 Binary fission, the splitting of a single-celled organism into two daughter cells

Chemistry 
 Binary phase, a chemical compound containing two different chemical elements

Arts and entertainment 
 Binary (comics), a superheroine in the Marvel Universe
 Binary (Doctor Who audio)

Music 
 Binary form, a way of structuring a piece of music
 Binary (Ani DiFranco album), 2017
 Binary (Kay Tse album), 2008
 "Binary" (song), a 2007 single by Assemblage 23

Novel 
 Binary (novel), a 1972 novel by Michael Crichton (writing as John Lange)
 Binary, an evil organization in the novel InterWorld

Other uses 
 Binary opposition, polar opposites, often ignoring the middle ground
 Gender binary, the classification of sex and gender into two distinct and disconnected forms of masculine and feminine

See also 
 Binary logic (disambiguation)
 Binomial (disambiguation)
 Boolean (disambiguation)
 Secondary (disambiguation)
 Ternary (disambiguation)
 Unary (disambiguation)